Taronga Western Plains Zoo, formerly known as (and still commonly referred to as) Western Plains Zoo and commonly known as Dubbo Zoo, is a large zoo near Dubbo, New South Wales, Australia. It opened to the public on 28 February 1977, to provide more living and breeding space for large animals such as elephants and antelopes which needed more space than was available at the restricted Sydney site. The zoo is run by the Taronga Conservation Society (formerly Zoological Parks Board of New South Wales), along with Taronga Zoo Sydney. Western Plains Zoo is located on the Newell Highway in west Dubbo about 5 km from the city.

History
In the late 1960s, plans to develop a large plains zoo to complement Sydney's Taronga Zoo were established. The new zoo would provide breeding facilities particularly suited to the large plains dwelling animals and to fulfil a need for an open range facility for the display of mainly grazing animals. After considerable planning and preparation, a site on the outskirts of Dubbo in central West New South Wales was chosen. Formerly an army camp during World War Two, the site was transformed into a 300 hectare zoo of woodland and irrigated grasslands.

Western Plains Zoo opened to the public on 28 February 1977. When the zoo opened, it contained 35 different animals from six countries. The zoo is an open-range design, with walls and fences replaced by concealed moats which divide the animals from the visitors. This creates the impression of actually being with the animals in the wild. It was also the first zoo to be built in Australia in 60 years.

Queen Elizabeth II visited the Western Plains Zoo in 1992.

In 1994 Western Plains Zoo was awarded as the Best Major Tourist Attraction, the highest honour in Australian Tourism.

On 26 September 2006, The Daily Liberal published an article announcing British comedian John Cleese was visiting the zoo "in order to raise money for a new Greater One-Horned rhino exhibit".

Name change
The zoo changed its name to Taronga Western Plains Zoo on 21 January 2008, citing the need to draw attention to the work of the Taronga Conservation Society Australia.

Zoo friends
Zoo Friends was an organisation which offered support in form of volunteers and fund raising for both Taronga Zoo Sydney and Western Plains Zoo. Members were eligible to volunteer to help at the Zoo. In 2009 the organisation was disbanded and all assets donated to the Taronga Conservation Foundation. Taronga Zoo Sydney now runs its own volunteer program.

Animals

Africa
Addax
African lion
African wild dog
Barbary sheep
Black rhinoceros
Bongo
Cheetah
Common eland
Dromedary camel
Giraffe
Hippopotamus
Leopard tortoise
Meerkat
Ostrich
Plains zebra
Scimitar-horned oryx
Southern white rhinoceros

Americas
Black-handed spider monkey
Galápagos tortoise

Asia
Asian elephant
Asian small-clawed otter
Banteng
Blackbuck
Fallow deer
Greater one-horned rhinoceros
Indian peafowl
Persian onager
Przewalski's horse
Siamang
Sumatran tiger
White-handed gibbon

Australia
Eastern grey kangaroo
Emu
Koala
Quokka
Red-necked wallaby
Short-beaked echidna
Swamp wallaby
Tasmanian devil
Western quoll

Madagascar
Black-and-white ruffed lemur
Ring-tailed lemur

Gallery

See also
Jim Lacey - General manager of the Western Plains Zoo from 1988 until 1992
Taronga Zoo Sydney

References

External links

 
 Zoo Friends, a supporter of the Zoo, offers membership and volunteer opportunities

1977 establishments in Australia
Zoos established in 1977
Dubbo
Zoos in New South Wales